This is a list of Walter Lantz "Cartunes" featuring Andy Panda.  All are entries in Lantz's Andy Panda series, except for $21 a Day (Once a Month) a Swing Symphony cartoon, Musical Moments from Chopin, a Musical Miniatures cartoon, and Banquet Busters and The Woody Woodpecker Polka, two Woody Woodpecker cartoons.

Directors for each short are noted. Several Andy Panda cartoons produced in 1940, 1941, and 1942 carry no director credit; Walter Lantz claims to have directed these shorts himself. Six Andy Panda cartoons (Life Begins for Andy Panda, Knock-Knock, Fish Fry, Apple Andy, The Bandmaster, and Scrappy Birthday) along with Musical Moments from Chopin and Banquet Busters were released in The Woody Woodpecker and Friends Classic Cartoon Collection.

1939

1940

1941

1942

1943

1944

1945

1946

1947

1948

1949

1951

References

Andy Panda theatrical cartoons, List of
Andy Panda theatrical cartoons, list of